Camp Orange: The Curse of the Emerald Eye is the fourth season in Australian reality show Camp Orange. Four teams of previously selected best friends travel to an un-known location for a week and compete in challenges to win the title of 'Ultimate Nick Campers'. Maude Garrett hosts her third season.

Overview

The teams of this series were:
E-Bash; Ashlee Mather and Ebony Roach.
Shorties; Harley and Ty Telford.
L.A. Blitz; Ally and Lauren.
Gromstars; Jake and Sean Ryan.

The winners of the overall competition was E-Bash.
Ebony Roach and Ashlee Mather from Victoria, Australia.

Day 1
The teams arrive at Raven Hall, the most haunted house in Australia. Upon arrival, the teams hear some spooky organ music. They eventually find Maude, who asks the teams who was playing the organ music.

Later, Maude tells the teams that the house they are in now, once owned to Earl Edgar Bird. Maude puts on a tape and they see the man himself. He explains that on a round-the-world trip, him and his faithful man servant Roderick, returned from the Amazon with a cursed crystal in his luggage: The Emerald Eye, which made Raven Hall become haunted. He, then, explains that the only way to lift the curse is to return the Emerald Eye to the Amazon. He wasn't up to it though, so it came down to the teams. He had hidden the Emerald Eye somewhere on his property, because they had to prove themselves. They had to find it so it could be returned. He then explains that they have to face the same challenges as he faced all over the world.

Challenge 1
While in Africa, Roderick and his servant, the Earl had trouble.

The team members are tied back to back and have to find relics in the mud.

Challenge 2: Mummy Come Home
While in Egypt, Roderick and the Earl got into a lot of tangles in Cairo.

One team member was disguised as an Egyptian mummy. They had to unwind and free their teammate from the sarcoughagus. The sarcougagus was then loaded with treasure and rolled to the finish line.

1st: The Shorties
2nd: The Gromstars
3rd: L.A Blitz
4th: E-Bash

Den of Secrets Day 1
The Shorties were winning the key tally with 4 and the Gromstars on 3. Both the girl teams were on 2 keys.

Cryptic Clue: Shorties
Cellar Of Lost Soles: L.A Blitz

Later, the Shorties had collected the next piece of the Roderick's travel map and another roll of film. Roderick was delighted and said that he was going to Greece and Tibet next. As L.A Blitz's dare, they had to eat 'monkey eyeball's'.

Day 2

Challenge 1: Pillars of Hercules

Roderick knew that in Greece the pillars of Hercules showed the location of a precious artifact. But when Roderick and the Earl got there the place was in ruins. They had to rebuild the pillars stone by stone.

The teams had to rebuild the pillars so that the largest stone was on the bottom and the smallest stone was on top. If done correctly, it would reveal the location of an artifact. The team to bring it back to Maude wins.

1st: E-Bash
Un-Completed: The Shorties, The Gromstars and L.A Blitz

Challenge 2: The Abominable Foot Race
Roderick and the Earl were taking a shortcut across Mount Everest when the snow had melted to reveal a Yeti's foot that was starting to thaw. They risked frostbite and some very sensitive areas to get that Yeti's foot to safety, let me assure you.

At the start of this challenge both teammates were on the same pair of skis. When they got to the buckets of ice they had to put as many ice-cubes as they could in their waterproof pants. When they got to the basket they had to fill it to the line with ice-cubes to preserve the foot. They then got out of the skis and took the baskets over. There they had to put on their Yeti snot (slime) filled gum-boots, load their cargo and race to the finish line.

1st: The Shorties and L.A Blitz
2nd: E-Bash
3rd: The Gromstars.

Den of Secrets Day 2
In the key tally, The Shorties were winning on 6, E-Bash on 5 and both L.A Blitz and The Gromstars on 4.

Cryptic Clue: E-Bash
Cellar Of Lost Soles: L.A Blitz

Later, E-Bash had collected the next piece and Roderick revealed that next they were off to China and Borneo. The dare was for L.A Blitz to wash the Roderick's socks.

2000s Australian reality television series
Nickelodeon (Australia and New Zealand) original programming
2008 Australian television series debuts
2008 Australian television series endings